Jo Jo Dancer, Your Life Is Calling is a 1986 American biographical comedy-drama film directed, produced by and starring Richard Pryor, who also wrote the screenplay with Paul Mooney and Rocco Urbisci. Jo Jo Dancer, Your Life Is Calling was Richard Pryor's first and only directorial effort, although he is credited as such on the screen version of his 1983 stand-up comedy concert film.

Background
Pryor plays Jo Jo Dancer, a popular stand-up comedian, who has severely burned himself while freebasing cocaine. The film came out six years after Pryor had set himself on fire while freebasing.

Synopsis
As Dancer lies hospitalized in a coma, his spiritual alter ego revisits his life, from growing up in a brothel as a child and struggling to beat the long odds to become a top-rated comedian. However, his success leads to extensive drug use and womanizing that takes its toll on his life. It affects every relationship, including his marriages. Jo Jo's spirit watches and attempts to convince his past self to end the cycle of self-destruction.

Cast

Production
The earlier parts of the film were shot in Pryor's hometown of Peoria, Illinois.

Reception
Jo Jo Dancer, Your Life is Calling received mixed reviews from critics. It currently has a 54% "Rotten" rating on the movie review aggregator site Rotten Tomatoes based on 13 reviews.

In popular culture

The title of the film is mentioned in the lyrics to the 2013 Afrojack song "The Spark" and the 2016 Danny Brown song “Downward Spiral”.

In the TV series Archer, the movie was referenced in the 8th episode of Season 7, "Liquid Lunch", by Dr. Krieger as the one-man show,  “Jo Jo Dancer - Ihr Leben Ruft”, he was performing.

References

External links 
 
 

1986 films
1986 comedy-drama films
1986 directorial debut films
1980s American films
1980s English-language films
1980s biographical drama films
African-American biographical dramas
African-American comedy-drama films
American biographical drama films
American comedy-drama films
Biographical films about entertainers
Columbia Pictures films
Films about comedians
Films about drugs
Films about prostitution in the United States
Films directed by Richard Pryor
Films scored by Herbie Hancock
Films set in Los Angeles
Films set in Illinois
Films set in Ohio
Films with screenplays by Richard Pryor
Mafia comedy films